Durga Soren (1969-2009) was a leader of Jharkhand Mukti Morcha and a member of Jharkhand Legislative Assembly. He was the son of JMM chief Shibu Soren and the husband of Sita Soren, who was a Member of Jharkhand Legislative Assembly from Jama constituency. He was also the elder brother of Hemant Soren, the current Chief Minister of Jharkhand.

Durga Soren was elected as a Member of Legislative Assembly from Jama constituency from 1995 to 2000. He lost in the 2005 assembly poll to Sunil Soren of Bharatiya Janata Party. He also contested election from Godda constituency for Lok Sabha but lost to Nishikant Dubey of Bharatiya Janata Party.

He died at his Bokaro residence in his sleep on 21 May 2009, aged just 40. The cause of death was termed as a brain haemorrhage. He is survived by his parents Shibu and Roopi, wife Sita Soren and three daughters, Jayshree Soren, Rajshree Soren and Vijayshree Soren.

References

Jharkhand Mukti Morcha politicians
1970 births
2009 deaths
Bihar MLAs 1995–2000
Jharkhand MLAs 2000–2005
Members of the Jharkhand Legislative Assembly